Jivarus ronderosi is a species of spur-throated grasshopper in the family Acrididae. It is found in Ecuador.

References

External links

 

Melanoplinae
Invertebrates of Ecuador
Insects described in 2010